Henry Savile may refer to:

Henry Savile (died 1558) (1498–1558), MP for Yorkshire
Henry Savile (died 1569) (1518–1569), MP for Yorkshire and Grantham
Henry Savile (Bible translator) (1549–1622), English scholar and Member of the Parliament
Sir Henry Savile, 1st Baronet (1579–1632), English politician
Henry Savile (politician) (1642–1687), English courtier and diplomat